Sir Arthur Throckmorton (ca. 1557 – 21 July 1626) was an English courtier and politician.

He was the second son of the diplomat Sir Nicholas Throckmorton of Beddington, Surrey  and was educated at Magdalen College, Oxford. His sister Elizabeth incurred the Queen's displeasure by secretly marrying Sir Walter Raleigh. Arthur inherited estates in several counties on the death of his father in 1571 (his elder brother was adjudged a lunatic) and after his marriage opted to reside at Paulerspury in Northamptonshire. He travelled abroad from 1580 to 1582 after which he joined the court of Queen Elizabeth I.

He was elected the Member of Parliament for Colchester, Essex in 1589. He was knighted in 1596 whilst on a military expedition to Cadiz, and appointed High Sheriff of Northamptonshire in 1604.

He married Ann, the daughter of Sir Thomas Lucas of Colchester, Essex, with whom he had four daughters.

Notes

References
Tudorplace biography
History of Parliament THROCKMORTON, Arthur (c.1557-1626)

External links
http://www.british-history.ac.uk/report.aspx?compid=22788

1550s births
1626 deaths
High Sheriffs of Northamptonshire
English MPs 1589
Arthur